The 1956 All-Eastern football team consists of American football players chosen by various selectors as the best players at each position among the Eastern colleges and universities during the 1956 NCAA University Division football season. 

Five players were unanimously named to the first team by the Associated Press (AP), United Press (UP), and International News Service (INS): halfback Jim Brown of Syracuse; fullback Bob Kyasky of Army; end Joe Walton of Pitt; guard Sam Valentine of Penn State; and Wilson Whitmire of Navy.

Backs 
 Jim Brown, Syracuse (AP-1, UP-1, INS-1 [hb])
 Bob Kyasky, Army (AP-1, UP-1, INS-1 [fb])
 Milt Plum, Penn State (AP-1, UP-1)
 Dennis McGill, Yale (AP-1, INS-1 [hb])
 Guy Martin, Colgate (UP-1)
 Claude Benham, Columbia (INS-1 [qb])

Ends 
 Joe Walton, Pittsburgh (AP-1, UP-1, INS-1)
 Paul Lopata, Yale (AP-1, UP-1)
 Dick Arcand, Holy Cross (INS-1)

Tackles 
 Bob Pollock, Pittsburgh (AP-1, UP-1)
 George Kurker, Tufts (AP-1)
 Frank Solani, Colgate (INS-1)
 Mike Bowman, Princeton (INS-1)

Guards 
 Sam Valentine, Penn State (AP-1, UP-1, INS-1)
 Lou Lovely, Boston University (AP-1, UP-1 [t])
 Stan Slater, Army (UP-1)
 John Owselchik, Yale (INS-1)

Center 
 Wilson Whitmire, Navy (AP-1, UP-1, INS-1)

Key
 AP = Associated Press
 UP = United Press
 INS = International News Service

See also
 1956 College Football All-America Team

References

All-Eastern
All-Eastern college football teams